Good Rocking Tonight is a compilation album  by the blues musician Roy Brown.

Released by Route 66 Records in 1978 in mono as KIX-6, and is a follow-up to an earlier release titled Laughing But Crying (KIX-2).  This album's subtitle is "Legendary Recordings, Vol 2 (1947–1954)".  The cover features a portrait of Roy Brown, courtesy of Roy Brown, taken in 1950.

Some reviewers state that Brown's version of "Good Rocking Tonight" released in 1947, or Wynonie Harris' version from 1948, (depending on the source), is one of the contenders for the title of "first rock'n'roll record". The label of the 45 RPM record by Brown included the words "Rocking blues".

The back cover includes extensive liner notes, and biographical and autobiographical information attributed to:
 John Broven: "Roy Brown", Blues Unlimited 123–124
 Jonas Bernholm: unpublished interview
 Staffan Solding: Swedish Radio Broadcast, 1978

Track listing

All songs by Roy Brown except where noted.

Personnel 
 Placide Adams — drums [13)
 Chuck Badie — bass [10]
 Earl Barnes — tenor sax [1,3]
 Edgar Blanchard — guitar [6,8?,12]
 Frank Campbell — baritone saxophone [7]
 Walter Daniels — piano [3]
 Wallace Davenport — trumpet [3]
 Salvador Doucette — piano [13]
 Jimmy Davis — guitar [7,13,14]
 Johnny Fontenette — tenor saxophone [5,6,7,8?,10,12,13]
 Percy Gabriel — bass [3]
 Albert "June" Gardner — drums [14]
 James C. Harris — piano [14]
 Wilbur Herden — trumpet [6,8?,12]
 Ike Isaacs — bass [6,8?,12]
 George Jenkins — drums [12]
 Leonard Jefferson — bass [14]
 Bill Jones — guitar [3]
 Melvin Lastie — trumpet [13]
 Ray Miller — drums [7]
 Tony Moret — trumpet [1]
 Alexander Nelson — baritone saxophone [10]
 Charlie Nelson — piano [10]
 Bob Ogden — drums [1]
 Jerome O'Neill — alto saxophone [1]
 Frank Parker — drums [5]
 Sammy Parker — tenor saxophone [7,13,14]
 LeRoy Rankins — baritone saxophone [5,6,8?,12]
 Teddy Riley — trumpet [5,7,10,14]
 Edward Santineo — piano [5,6,8?,12]
 Louis Sargent — guitar [5]
 Calvin Sheilds — drums [6,8?]
 Tommy Shelvin — bass [5,7,13]
 Wilbert Smith — bass [10]
 Clement Tervalon — trombone [1,3]
 Victor Thomas — tenor saxophone [7,14]
 Jimmy Williams — piano [7]
 Unknown — bass [1,2,4,9,11] — drums [2,3,4,9,11] — guitar [1,11] — piano [1,2,4,9,11] — tenor saxophone [2,4,9,11] — trombone [2,4,9] — trumpet [2,4,9]

References

1978 compilation albums
Roy Brown (blues musician) albums